Timothy Allen McIntosh (born March 21, 1965) is an American former professional baseball player. He played parts of five seasons in Major League Baseball (MLB) between 1990 and 1996, mostly as a catcher and outfielder. He also played one season for the Nippon Ham Fighters of the Nippon Professional Baseball (NPB) in 1995.

In 1986, McIntosh played collegiate summer baseball for the Chatham A's of the Cape Cod Baseball League (CCBL). He led the league in batting with a .392 average, and in 2017 was inducted into the CCBL Hall of Fame.

References

External links

1965 births
Living people
American expatriate baseball players in Canada
American expatriate baseball players in Japan
Baseball players from Minneapolis
Beloit Brewers players
Chatham Anglers players
Columbus Clippers players
Denver Zephyrs players
El Paso Diablos players
Iowa Cubs players
Los Angeles Angels scouts
Los Angeles Angels of Anaheim scouts
Major League Baseball catchers
Major League Baseball left fielders
Major League Baseball right fielders
Milwaukee Brewers players
Minnesota Golden Gophers baseball players
Montreal Expos players
New York Yankees players
New York Yankees scouts
Nippon Ham Fighters players
Nippon Professional Baseball first basemen
Ottawa Lynx players
Sacramento Steelheads players
Salt Lake Buzz players
Stockton Ports players
Texas Rangers scouts